Exhaust, exhaustive, or exhaustion may refer to:

Law
Exhaustion of intellectual property rights, limits to intellectual property rights in patent and copyright law
Exhaustion doctrine, in patent law
 Exhaustion doctrine under U.S. law, in patent law
Exhaustion of remedies, restrictions on opening a new lawsuit while an original suit is pending

Mathematics
Brute-force attack, a cryptanalytic attack, also known as exhaustive key search
Collectively exhaustive, in probability and set theory, a collection of sets whose union equals the complete space
Exhaustion by compact sets, in analysis, a sequence of compact sets that converges on a given set
Method of exhaustion, in geometry, finding the area of a shape by approximating it with polygons
Proof by exhaustion, proof by examining all individual cases

Medicine
Exhaustion or fatigue (medical), a weariness caused by exertion 
Adrenal exhaustion or hypoadrenia, a hypothesized maladaption of the adrenal glands
Heat exhaustion or hyperthermia, a medical condition where the body is unable to control its accumulation of heat
Nervous exhaustion or neurasthenia, a nineteenth-century diagnosis encompassing fatigue, anxiety, and depression

Technology
Exhaust, in steam engines, steam released from a cylinder
Exhaust brake, a method of slowing diesel engines
Exhaust gas, a gas which occurs as a result of combustion of fuel
Exhaust manifold, a structure collecting an engine's exhaust outlets
Exhaust system, a mechanism for venting exhaust gases from an internal combustion engine
Exhaust velocity, a measure of engine efficiency

Other uses
Exhaust (band), a clarinet, drum, and tape trio in Montreal, Canada
Exhaust (album), the band's 1998 self-titled album
Exhaust date, the projected date that a telecommunications area code will have assigned all of its numbers
Exhaustive ballot, a multi-round voting system